Paris Sciences et Lettres University (PSL University or simply PSL) is a public research university based in Paris, France. It was established in 2010 and formally created as a university in 2019. It is a collegiate university with 11 constituent schools, with the oldest founded in 1530. PSL is located in central Paris, with its main sites in the Latin Quarter, at the Montagne Sainte-Geneviève campus, at the Jourdan campus, at Porte Dauphine in northern Paris, and at Carré Richelieu.

PSL awards Bachelor's, Master's, and PhD diplomas for its constituent schools and institutes. It offers an education based on research and interdisciplinary instruction, and its  students have access to a broad range of disciplines in science, engineering, humanities, social sciences, fine art and performing arts.

In 2022, PSL University was globally ranked 26th by the QS World University Rankings, 38th by the Academic Ranking of World Universities, and 40th by the Times Higher Education World University Rankings.

PSL alumni and staff include 28 Nobel laureates, 11 Fields Medalists, 3 Abel laureates, 49 CNRS Gold Medalists, 50 César winners and 79 Molière winners.

History 

In 2004, institutions in the Latin Quarter began thinking of how to join forces to boost their international visibility. The French law on research promulgated in 2006, which encouraged the formation of research networks (in various forms including PRES and RTRA), paved the way for new projects such as Paris Universitas, PRES ParisTech and an early version of the PSL project. This new organization combined five institutions of higher education in the Latin Quarter: Chimie ParisTech, Collège de France, École normale supérieure (Paris), École Supérieure de Physique et de Chimie Industrielles de la ville de Paris (ESPCI Paris), and Observatoire de Paris.<ref>{{Cite news |url=http://www.lemonde.fr/societe/article/2010/04/16/cinq-grandes-ecoles-parisiennes-creent-une-fondation_1335060_3224.html |title=Cinq grandes écoles parisiennes créent une fondation |newspaper=Le Monde |date=16 April 2010}}</ref> Together, they adopted the status of a scientific cooperation foundation (FCS) (fr). The new entity, called "Paris Sciences et Lettres – Quartier Latin", was initially conceived as a scientific alliance.. In 2011, the five institutions submitted a joint application for the Initiatives for Excellence (IDEX) as part of France's Investing for the Future program (PIA), causing the project to evolve into a new form of French university. This university would have 70% of its students at the Master's and PhD level and offer a Bachelor's program, with an emphasis on equal opportunity students (40% scholarship students in the CPES multidisciplinary preparatory class).

 Development 
Between 2011 and 2012, ten new institutions joined the foundation: Conservatoire National Supérieur d'Art Dramatique, Conservatoire National Supérieur de Musique et de Danse de Paris, École Nationale Supérieure des Arts Décoratifs, École Nationale Supérieure des Beaux-Arts, La Fémis, Pierre-Gilles de Gennes Foundation for Research, Institut Curie, Institut Louis-Bachelier, MINES ParisTech and Université Paris-Dauphine.

Their arrival reinforced PSL's scientific potential in the fields of engineering, biology, the arts, and management. In 2014, another four institutions specializing in humanities and social science joined the association: École Française d'Extrême-Orient, École des Hautes Etudes en Sciences Sociales (EHESS), École Nationale des Chartes, and École Pratique des Hautes Etudes (EPHE).In 2015, PSL organized itself into a university community (ComUE: PSL Research University). PSL began awarding PhDs at that point.

 "Investing for the Future" program 
In 2010, the French government launched a call for proposals to boost higher education: the Investing for the Future program (also called the grand emprunt). PSL has successfully responded to several calls for proposals. In 2011, with the Initiatives for Excellence call for proposals, PSL was one of the first three projects selected, along with Université de Bordeaux and Université de Strasbourg.

While the diversity of project participants has sometimes been cited as a weakness, the promoters of PSL underline the complementarity of its institutions and the potential for collaboration. The funding of the Excellence Initiative has, in addition, supported the creation of 11 Laboratories of excellence (Labex) within PSL: CelTisPhyBio, DCBIOL, DEEP, DYNAMO, ENS-ICFP, ESEP, IEC, IPGG, MemoLife, TransferS, and WIFI. In 2014, the Corail, HaStec, and TEPSIS Labex laboratories joined the list with EHESS and EPHE becoming members of PSL. 
Also in 2011, PSL's institutions presented ten projects under the "Equipped with excellence" (Equipex) program. Among the initial submissions, they obtained 8 Equipex facilities: BEDOFIH, D-FIH, Equip@Meso, ICGex, IPGG, Paris-en-Resonnance, Planaqua, Ultrabrain. These projects have received funding ranging from 2 to 10 million euros.

In 2017, after a detailed review process, 9 institutions agreed to put in place an integrated budget and a multi-year strategy for academic recruitment, as well as to create a number of shared platforms and services. Chimie ParisTech, École Nationale des Chartes, École Normale Supérieure, École Pratique des Hautes Etudes, ESPCI Paris, Institut Curie, Observatoire de Paris, MINES ParisTech, Université Paris-Dauphine decided to jointly form Université PSL. 
The agreement approved by their respective boards calls for the schools and institutions that form the university to adopt a unified strategy, to submit to the budgetary authority of the president of the university, to jointly plan their recruitment, and to transfer the whole of their diplomas to PSL. Towards the end of the process, in 2018, one of the former members, EHESS, did not approve the new statutes and decided not to be part of the target University.

Beaux-Arts de Paris, Collège de France, Conservatoire National Supérieur d'Art Dramatique, Conservatoire National Supérieur de Musique et de Danse de Paris, École Française d'Extrême-Orient, École Nationale Supérieure des Arts Décoratifs, La Fémis, Institut de Biologie Physico-Chimique and Institut Louis Bachelier are recognized as associates of the university pending later integration.

 University status (2019) 
In 2018, an opportunity to formally create a full University arose with a new Ordonnance (ordinance) allowing to create a collegiate University, whose constituents may keep their legal personality, quite similarly to the constituent faculties of a British university like University of Cambridge. This Ordinance was frequently nicknamed 'Ordonnance PSL' because it was generally considered that PSL would be one of the obvious beneficiary of this new opportunity.

In 2019, a few changes occur in the list of constituents, and finally 9 institutions approve the new statutes and become établissement-composante (constituent college): Chimie ParisTech, Conservatoire national supérieur d'art dramatique, École Nationale des Chartes, École normale supérieure, École pratique des hautes études, ESPCI Paris, Observatoire de Paris, MINES ParisTech, Paris Dauphine. In complement, two members with very specific statutes  College de France and Institut Curie become associate-members, also participating closely to the governance of the University. Associate members contribute to the strategy of the University, receive financial resources from PSL University and may carry scientific programs on behalf and by delegation thereof.

Three national research organisations – CNRS, INRIA, and Inserm – provide strategic and financial support to the university and participate in the Board of Directors.

The decree creating Université PSL as a collegiate university, together with the new statutes of the University, is published in November 2019.

 Organisation and administration 
PSL is a collegiate university ( students). It consists of 11 constituent schools, with plans to gradually expand to include some or all other associate colleges. Three national research organisations (CNRS, Inserm, Inria) are involved in governance and help to define PSL's strategy, with which they coordinate their own strategies.

 Constituent colleges 

 Associate colleges 

 Research organisations 

 CNRS
 Inria
 Inserm

 Presidents 
The current president is Alain Fuchs. He took over the position from Thierry Coulhon, who was appointed advisor to the French President in charge of Education, Higher Education, and Research.

 2012–2014: Monique Canto-Sperber, previously director of ENS, founder and first president of PSL
 September 2014 – February 2015 (acting) Romain Soubeyran, director of MINES ParisTech 
 2014–2017: Thierry Coulhon, previously director of the Mathematical Sciences Institute at Australian National University in Canberra
 June – October 2017 (acting) Marc Mézard, director of ENS
 2017 – to present: Alain Fuchs, previously president of CNRS

 Organization 
PSL is administered by a Board of Directors chaired by the PSL president. It relies on the recommendations of an Academic Council and a Strategic Steering Committee. The executive organ of the university is the Executive Committee (the president, vice-presidents, and deans), supported by the Council of Members.

Programs 
PSL offers education from undergraduate to doctoral level, across all academic disciplines, including life sciences, physical sciences, humanities and social sciences, creative arts, economics, administration and management.

All of PSL's institutions have adopted a model of education through research.

 Undergraduate programs 
PSL and the Lycée Henri IV, along with Mines ParisTech, ESPCI Paris, Paris Dauphine University, Paris Observatory, Ecole normale supérieure and Lycée Louis-le-Grand have implemented a three-year undergraduate program : CPES Multidisciplinary undergraduate course.

At Université Paris-Dauphine, a constituent of Université PSL, bachelor's degrees are available for students in the following fields: management, economics and finance, accounting, applied mathematics, computing, journalism (IPJ-Dauphine).

 Sustainable Development Goals 
PSL is co-leader of the SDSN Network for France, under the initiative of the United Nations., together with Kedge Business School and Universite Cergy-Pontoise.
In this context, Université PSL is promoting that all students shall have access to courses related to climate, biodiversity and sustainability.

PSL has launched in 2020 a bachelor program dedicated to sustainability sciences.

PSL organizes a yearly summer school open to European students, to help understand the challenges of sustainable development : the European School of Positive Impact and Responsibility (ESPOIR).

 Graduate education 
Université PSL offers training programs for graduate students through its constituent schools in a broad array of disciplines : engineering, fine and applied arts, management, economics, biology, humanities and social sciences, astronomy.

The first post-graduate/Master programme to be created under the umbrella of PSL between l'Université Paris-Dauphine and the Ecole normale supérieure, was the specialization Peace Studies launched in 2014 within the Master of International affairs and development.

 Doctoral programs 
More than 70% of PSL students are at the Master's or PhD level.  University PSL Graduate Programs are inspired by the graduate schools that can be found in most of the world's research universities. The first two programs of this kind are a Graduate program in the Humanities (Translitterae) and a PhD program in Cognitive science (FrontCog).

 SACRe Doctoral program 
The "Science Art Creation Research" (SACRe) doctoral program aims at developing new fields of research by exploring the interfaces between the arts, and between arts and science (hard sciences as well as the humanities and social sciences). The program implements a new kind of PhD in Art strongly articulating practice and theoretical thinking. 
It brings together, along with the Ecole normale supérieure, five French schools of creative and performing arts : CNSAD (French professional acting school), Conservatoire national supérieur de musique et de danse de Paris (dance, music and sound design), École nationale supérieure des arts décoratifs, École nationale supérieure des Beaux-Arts, La Fémis.

 Research 

PSL hosts some 140 laboratories,  research and teaching staff, and about 100 ERC grants. 
The scientific research strategy is organised around a core of discipline-specific programs and interdisciplinary programs such as the laboratories of excellence (Labex) (fr) and the Interdisciplinary and Strategic Research Initiatives.
Examples of interdisciplinary programs are  Scripta (History and practices of writing), the OCAV program (Origins and Conditions for the Emergence of Life), or the Q-Life Institute.

PSL's research landscape includes the following research fields: law, economics, and business administration; literature, literary theory, and philosophy; aesthetics and art theory; life and health sciences; area studies; energy and engineering; physics; chemistry; history; anthropology; informatics and data science; mathematics; materials science and soft matter science; cognitive science; sociology; earth & space science; religious studies; archaeology and heritage science.

 International rankings 

The first recognition of PSL's existence as an integrated university came in 2017, when it appeared on the Times Higher Education ranking in 72rd place globally and 1st place in France, and 41st place globally in 2018.

In 2020, PSL University appears for the first time in two other major university rankings : CWTS Leiden Ranking and ARWU: in the Shanghai ranking'' it is ranked 36th and 2nd French University behind Paris-Saclay University. In  ARWU Global Ranking of Academic Subjects (also known as Shanghai Ranking by Subjects) University PSL is ranked among the best world universities in 39 of the 54 subjects, e.g., 10th in the world for Mathematics and for Physics, and 12th in Ecology.

In 2022, Université PSL is ranked first in the Young University Rankings 2022.

Partnerships 
International in scope, PSL has cultivated framework agreements with the University of Cambridge, UCL, EPFL, Columbia, Berkeley, NYU, Technion, ANU, Peking University, Shanghai Jiao Tong, National Taiwan University, Tsinghua University, and Hong Kong University of Science and Technology.

PSL Symphonic Orchestra and Choir 
The PSL Orchestra and Choir is a choral symphonic ensemble open to all members of the Université PSL community. PSL Orchestra and Choir's musical season consists of five different programs and incorporates contemporary work from different countries.

Nobel and Fields laureates 
Serge Haroche – B.A and Professor – Nobel in Physics – 2012
Albert Fert – B.A – Nobel in Physics – 2007
Claude Cohen-Tannoudji – B.A and Professor – Nobel in Physics – 1997
Georges Charpak – B.A and Professor – Nobel in Physics – 1992
Pierre-Gilles de Gennes – B.A and Professor – Nobel in Physics – 1991
Louis Néel – B.A – Nobel in Physics – 1970
Alfred Kastler – B.A – Nobel in Physics – 1966
Jean Perrin – B.A – Nobel in Physics – 1926
Gabriel Lippmann – B.A – Nobel in Physics – 1908
Marie Curie – PhD – Nobel in Physics – 1903
Pierre Curie – PhD – Nobel in Physics – 1903
Jean-Marie Lehn – Professor – Nobel in Chemistry – 1987
Frédéric Joliot-Curie – B.A and Professor – Nobel in Chemistry – 1935
Irène Joliot-Curie – Professor – Nobel in Chemistry – 1935
Paul Sabatier – B.A and PhD – Nobel in Chemistry – 1912
Marie Curie – PhD – Nobel in Chemistry – 1911
Henri Moissan – B.A – Nobel in Chemistry – 1906
Jean Dausset – Professor   – Nobel in Physiology and Medicine – 1980
Jacques Monod – Professor  – Nobel in Physiology and Medicine – 1965
François Jacob – Professor – Nobel in Physiology and Medicine – 1965
Charles Nicolle – Professor – Nobel in Physiology and Medicine – 1928
Jean-Paul Sartre – B.A – Nobel in Literature – 1964
Roger Martin du Gard – B.A – Nobel in Literature – 1937
Henri Bergson – B.A and Professor – Nobel in Literature – 1927
Romain Rolland – B.A – Nobel in Literature – 1915
Esther Duflo – B.A – Nobel in Economics – 2019
Jean Tirole – PhD – Nobel in Economics – 2014
Maurice Allais – Grad Attendee and Professor – Nobel in Economics – 1988
Gérard Debreu – B.A – Nobel in Economics – 1983
Cédric Villani – B.A, PhD and Professor – Fields Medal – 2010
Ngô Bảo Châu – B.A – Fields Medal – 2010
Wendelin Werner – B.A and Professor – Fields Medal – 2006
Laurent Lafforgue – B.A – Fields Medal – 2002
 Jean-Christophe Yoccoz – B.A and Professor – Fields Medal – 1994
 Pierre-Louis Lions – B.A and Professor – Fields Medal – 1994
 Alain Connes – B.A and Professor – Fields Medal – 1982
René Thom – B.A – Fields Medal – 1958
Jean-Pierre Serre – B.A and Professor – Fields Medal – 1954
Laurent-Moïse Schwartz – B.A – Fields Medal – 1950
Hugo Duminil-Copin – B.A – Fields Medal – 2022

Notable Alumni

Business leaders
 Odile Hembise Fanton d’Andon: CEO of the ACRI-ST (since 2000)
 Emmanuel Roman: CEO of PIMCO
 Olivier François: President and CEO of Fiat
 Anne Rigail, CEO of Air France (since 2018) 
 Patrick Pouyanné, CEO of TotalEnergies (since 2014)
 Jacques Aschenbroich, CEO of Valeo (since 2009)
 Jean-Laurent Bonnafé, CEO of BNP Paribas (since 2011)
 Tidjane Thiam, CEO of Credit Suisse (2015-2020)
 Carlos Ghosn, CEO of Nissan (2001-2018) and CEO of Renault-Nissan (2005-2018)
 Anne Lauvergeon, CEO of Areva (2001-2011)
 Thierry Desmarest, CEO of Total (1995-2010)
 Didier Lombard, CEO of France Télécom (2005-2010)
 Jean-Louis Beffa, CEO of Saint-Gobain (1986-2007)
 Jean-Martin Folz, CEO of PSA Peugeot Citroën (1995-2007)
 Denis Ranque, CEO of Thales Group (1998-2009)
 Noël Forgeard, former CEO of Airbus (1998-2005) and EADS (2005-2006)
 Francis Mer, CEO of Usinor (1986-2001) and former Minister of Finances of France (2002-2004)
  Thierry Bolloré: CEO of Jaguar Land Rover, former CEO of  the Renault group
 Jacques Aigrain: Chairman & CEO of Swiss Re
 Michel Combes: CEO of Alcatel-Lucent, former CEO of TDF
 Christophe Chenut : CEO of Lacoste
 Thierry Morin : Chairman & CEO of Valeo
 François Pierson: Chairman of AXA France
 Bruno Bonnell: Chairman & founder of Infogrames, former CEO of Atari
  Régis Arnoux: CEO and founder of Catering International Services
 Diane Barrière-Desseigne: CEO of Groupe Lucien Barrière
 Jean-Michel Severino: CEO of the French Development Agency
 Florent Menegaux: Chairman & CEO of Michelin group
  Philippe Dupont: Chairman of BPCE
 Eugène Schueller, founder of L'Oréal
 Philippe Camus (1967), Chairman of Alcatel Lucent
 Isabelle Kocher (1987), CEO of Engie 
 Jean-Charles Naouri  (1967), CEO of Groupe Casino
 Georges Claude, founder of Air Liquide
 Régis Schultz, CEO of JD Sports
 Yannick Bolloré, CEO of Havas, chairman of the supervisory board of Vivendi, Vice Chairman of  Bolloré group
Politicians
 Laurent Fabius (1966), Prime Minister of France, 1984-1986
 Édouard Herriot (1891), Prime Minister of France, 1924-1925, 1926 and 1932
 Jean Jaurès (1878), Socialist leader
 Alain Juppé (1964), Prime Minister of France 1995-1997
 Bruno Le Maire (1989), Minister of the Economy, 2017-present ; Minister of Agriculture 2009-2012
 Benny Lévy (1965), founder of Gauche prolétarienne
 Paul Painlevé (1883), mathematician; Prime Minister of France in 1917 and 1925
 Georges Pompidou (1931), Prime Minister of France 1962-1968; President of France 1969-1974
 Alain Poher (1909–1996), politician, president of Sénat, president by interim of French Republic.
 Jean-Louis Bianco (1943–), General Secretary of President of France (1982–1991), Minister of Social Affairs (France) (1991–1992), Minister of Transport (France) (1992–1993), députy of Alpes de Haute Provence's 1st constituency (1997–)
 Charles de Freycinet, prime minister of France at the end of the 19th century
 Albert François Lebrun (1871–1950), president of France
 Najla Bouden Romdhane (1958–), prime minister of Tunisia (2021–)
 Boni Yayi: President of the Republic of Benin
 Raymond Ndong Sima: Prime Minister of Gabon
 Faure Gnassingbe: President of Togo

References

External links 
 Université PSL Website (English version)
 PSL Facebook Page

Paris Sciences et Lettres University
Universities and colleges in France
5th arrondissement of Paris
Universities and colleges formed by merger in France
Public universities in France